Malcolm Geddes (1832–1916) was mayor of the City of Toowoomba, Queensland in 1895.  He was born in 1832 in Lurgon, Armagh, Ireland, and married Mary McStay in 1855 in Ireland.  He died on 2 July 1916 in Toowoomba.

References

1832 births
1916 deaths
Mayors of Toowoomba